Maria Kristin Yulianti (born 25 June 1985) is an Indonesian badminton player. She is a bronze medalist in women's singles at the 2008 Olympics.

Career

2004 
Yulianti played in some satellite competitions and won the Malaysian tournament.

2005 
Yulianti played in more satellite tournaments and won three: the Surabaya, Jakarta, and the Cheers Asian satellite tournaments.

2006 
Yulianti started to play tougher competitions but still played in satellite tournaments. She played in the Bitburger Open and achieved runner-up, beaten by Xu Huaiwen of Germany in the final, but she scored an upset by beating the seeded player Pi Hongyan of France in the quarterfinal. She played in the Singapore Satellite tournament and claimed the title. She became the most successful player on the national team.

2007 
This year, Yulianti was the dominant player on her team. She played in the World Championships as the 15th seed, her highest rank in 2007. She was beaten in the third round by the world number one, Zhang Ning of China. She reached her first quarterfinal of the Super Series tournament in Indonesia, by beating Lu Lan of China in a rubber set. She was stopped by Petya Nedelcheva of Bulgaria in straight sets. In December, she won the Southeast Asian Games in Thailand over fellow countrywoman Adriyanti Firdasari.

2008 
She competed in a few Super Series tournaments such as All England and the Swiss Open but was stopped in the first round in each. She entered the Uber Cup team and won against the second-seeded country, Japan, by a score of 4–1. While she was defeated by the Japanese, Eriko Hirose, 21–9, 20–22, 20–22, her teammates secured the team victory against the other Japanese players. They reached the final for the first time in 14 years by beating Hong Kong in the quarterfinal and Germany in the semifinal. They were defeated in the final by China, 0–3.

Yulianti competed in the Indonesia Open. She beat her compatriot, Pia Zebadiah Bernadet and Yao Jie of Netherlands in the first two rounds. She followed this by defeating the 7th seed, Zhou Mi of Hong Kong in three sets, 21–17, 15–21, 21–16. She accomplished a big upset by beating the Chinese senior player and second seed, Zhang Ning, in a very tight match, 21–14, 20–22, 22–20 and reached her first Super Series final. There she was beaten by the 1st seed, Zhu Lin, after fighting for more than an hour in three sets, 18–21, 21–17, 14–21.

Yulianti's biggest achievement in the sport, thus far, is earning the women's singles bronze medal at the 2008 Summer Olympics as an unseeded player. She is only the third Indonesian woman, and the fifth woman not representing China, to be awarded a medal in women's singles since badminton entered the Games in 1992. In the round of 64, she saved a match point against Juliane Schenk of Germany and won the game in the rubber set, 18–21, 21–13, 22–20. She followed this by defeating Yoana Martínez of Spain in straight sets. She started to get noticed after she defeated the All England champion, Tine Rasmussen of Denmark, in three sets, 18–21, 21–19, 21–14. She reached the semifinal by beating Saina Nehwal of India after she saved 8 game points and won 26–28, 21–14, 21–15. She lost to eventual gold medalist Zhang Ning in the semifinal, 15–21, 15–21. However, Yulianti defeated the 3rd seed, Lu Lan, in the playoff for the bronze medal, 11–21, 21–13, 21–15.

After the Olympics, she competed in some Super Series tournaments, although she was always defeated by Lu Lan in three sets. Notable matches include her victory over the 6th-seeded Wong Mew Choo of Malaysia in the Japan Open, 18–21, 21–13, 21–6, as well as her defeat of Zhu Lin, the 5th seed, 21–15, 21–14, in the French Open.

2009 
This year might be her worst time in her career. She got injured from December last year, and played her first Super Series tournament in June. Before that time, she was followed Malaysia, but failed to enter the next round, after beaten by Zhang Beiwen in the first round. Then, she was represented Indonesia in Sudirman Cup by only winning her first match against Sayaka Sato.

Achievements

Olympic Games 
Women's singles

Southeast Asian Games 

Women's singles

BWF Superseries (1 runner-up) 
The BWF Superseries, which was launched on 14 December 2006 and implemented in 2007, was a series of elite badminton tournaments, sanctioned by the Badminton World Federation (BWF). BWF Superseries levels were Superseries and Superseries Premier. A season of Superseries consisted of twelve tournaments around the world that had been introduced since 2011. Successful players were invited to the Superseries Finals, which were held at the end of each year.

Women's singles

  BWF Superseries Finals tournament
  BWF Superseries Premier tournament
  BWF Superseries tournament

IBF Grand Prix (1 runner-up) 
The World Badminton Grand Prix was sanctioned by the International Badminton Federation from 1983 to 2006.

Women's singles

BWF International Challenge/Series/Asian Satellite (5 titles, 1 runner-up) 
Women's singles

  BWF International Challenge tournament
  BWF International Series/Satellite tournament

Performance timeline

National team 
 Senior level

Individual competitions 
 Senior level

Record against selected opponents 
Record against year-end Finals finalists, World Championships semi-finalists, and Olympic quarter-finalists.

References

External links 

 
 PB Djarum Player's Profile

1985 births
Living people
People from Tuban
Sportspeople from East Java
Indonesian female badminton players
Badminton players at the 2008 Summer Olympics
Olympic badminton players of Indonesia
Olympic bronze medalists for Indonesia
Olympic medalists in badminton
Medalists at the 2008 Summer Olympics
Competitors at the 2003 Southeast Asian Games
Competitors at the 2005 Southeast Asian Games
Competitors at the 2007 Southeast Asian Games
Competitors at the 2009 Southeast Asian Games
Southeast Asian Games gold medalists for Indonesia
Southeast Asian Games silver medalists for Indonesia
Southeast Asian Games bronze medalists for Indonesia
Southeast Asian Games medalists in badminton
Indonesian Christians
20th-century Indonesian women
21st-century Indonesian women